Richard Armiger is a professional architectural model maker and the founder of Network Modelmakers. He is the Director of House Portrait Models, a brand established in 1998 within the studio to market handcrafted ‘model portraits’ of private homes and estates.

His creative and influential architectural models have been published worldwide and examples can be found in museums in the UK and internationally, including the permanent collection at the Victoria and Albert Museum, the Architecture Room at the annual Royal Academy of Arts Summer Show, and regularly at the Venice Biennale of Architecture.

Armiger’s architectural consultancy models, for John Pawson, Zaha Hadid, Grimshaw Architects, and the late Jan Kaplický have appeared frequently in architectural exhibitions worldwide.

The 2009 Design Museum's exhibition David Chipperfield - Form Matters, contained a selection of his models, including Sir David's shortlisted Tate Modern entry.

Early career and education 
Armiger attended the Maryland Institute College of Art near Roland Park, studying painting and sculpture. In Britain, he studied industrial design model making at the University for the Creative Arts thereafter settling in England in 1983.

Prior to establishing Network Modelmakers London, he was mentored by the Boston, USA designers at Cambridge Seven Associates. The architects and graphic designers at Cambridge Seven, in collaboration with Buckminster Fuller, designed the USA pavilion at Montreal’s Expo 67, their highest profile project from that era. [9]

In the UK, his first employer was the Festival of Britain chief architect Sir Hugh Casson of Casson Conder and Partners. Further design experience was gained at the BBC, Wolff Olins, and at the timber model shop within the Arup engineering consultancy.[9]

Architectural competition models 
Many London-based architects commission his models for projects of international stature and for architectural design competition. The tally of Armiger's models of design competition projects won by Nicholas Grimshaw Architects alone is significant:

Caixa Art Gallery, A Coruña, Spain
National Space Centre, Leicester, England
Southern Cross station, Melbourne, Australia
Enneus Heerma Bridge, Amsterdam, Netherlands
Frankfurt Exhibition Hall, Germany
Donald Danforth Plant Science Center, Missouri, USA

In 2006, Armiger and his team developed a model measuring 4 meters square that became the winning entry for Singapore's Gardens by the Bay competition, won jointly by Grant Associates landscape designers and Wilkinson Eyre architects.

Crossrail models and consultancy 
As consultant Model Coordinator to Crossrail, Richard Armiger helped clarify the project's complexity to the Parliamentary Select committee and other design laymen.

Models for Modernists and contemporary architects

Le Corbusier

Jan Kaplický

David Chipperfield

Models of historic buildings

Westminster Abbey

Notable projects

Museum projects

Villas and manorial homes

Other selected projects by locale

References

Porter, T., Neale, J. (2000). Architectural Supermodels. Architectural Press. 
Pawley, M. (1993). Future Systems: The Story of Tomorrow'''. Phaidon. 
Chipperfield, D. (2004). El Croquis, Nº 120: David Chipperfield (1998–2004). El Croquis.
Sudjic, D. (2005). John Pawson 1995-2005 Pause for Thought''. El Croquis.

External links
RIBA Drawings Collection - model of Villa Stein-de Monzie
V&A Beauty Collection - Model of Lord Burlington's Villa at Chiswick
Gardens by the Bay International Design Competition
Network Modelmakers Ltd

Living people
21st-century British architects
Maryland Institute College of Art alumni
Alumni of the University for the Creative Arts
Year of birth missing (living people)
American emigrants to England